North West Surrey was a county constituency in the county of Surrey.  It returned one Member of Parliament (MP) to the House of Commons of the Parliament of the United Kingdom.

The constituency was created for the February 1974 general election, and abolished for the 1997 general election.

History

Boundaries
1974–1997: The Urban Districts of (1) Egham, and (2) Frimley and Camberley (and the Rural District of Bagshot).  In later 1974 these became respectively: (1) the Borough of Runnymede wards of Egham, Englefield Green East, Englefield Green West, Hythe, Thorpe, and Virginia Water; (2) the Borough of Surrey Heath.

Members of Parliament

Elections

Elections in the 1970s

Elections in the 1980s

Elections in the 1990s

Notes and references 

Parliamentary constituencies in South East England (historic)
Constituencies of the Parliament of the United Kingdom established in 1974
Constituencies of the Parliament of the United Kingdom disestablished in 1997
Politics of Surrey